The following list shows all Labour Party Members of Parliament (MPs), Members of the European Parliament (MEPs), Constituency Labour Parties (CLPs), affiliated trades unions and socialist societies that nominated a candidate in the 2020 Labour Party deputy leadership election.

Rosena Allin-Khan

Parliamentary nominations

CLP and affiliate nominations

Richard Burgon

Parliamentary nominations

CLP and affiliate nominations

Dawn Butler

Parliamentary nominations

CLP and affiliate nominations

Ian Murray

Parliamentary nominations

CLP and affiliate nominations

Angela Rayner

Parliamentary nominations

CLP and affiliate nominations

Khalid Mahmood (withdrawn)

Parliamentary nominations

See also
 Nominations in the 2020 Labour Party leadership election

References 

2020 elections in the United Kingdom
2020 deputy nominations
Labour Party deputy leadership election